El Salvador requires its residents to register their motor vehicles and display vehicle registration plates. Current plates are North American standard 6 × 12 inches (152 × 300 mm). The new design started its use during 2011. In the background of the plate, you can find the flag of El Salvador.

References

El Salvador
Transport in El Salvador
El Salvador transport-related lists